Deerhorn Township is a township in Wilkin County, Minnesota, United States. The population was 111 at the 2000 census.

Deerhorn Township took its name from Deerhorn Creek.

Geography
The township contains one property listed on the National Register of Historic Places, the early-20th-century David N. Peet Farmstead.

Demographics
As of the census of 2000, there were 111 people, 40 households, and 36 families residing in the township. The population density was 3.1 people per square mile (1.2/km2). There were 48 housing units at an average density of 1.3/sq mi (0.5/km2). The racial makeup of the township was 95.50% White, 0.90% Asian, and 3.60% from two or more races. Hispanic or Latino of any race were 3.60% of the population.

There were 40 households, out of which 37.5% had children under the age of 18 living with them, 80.0% were married couples living together, 5.0% had a female householder with no husband present, and 10.0% were non-families. 10.0% of all households were made up of individuals, and 5.0% had someone living alone who was 65 years of age or older. The average household size was 2.78 and the average family size was 2.94.

In the township the population was spread out, with 25.2% under the age of 18, 7.2% from 18 to 24, 34.2% from 25 to 44, 24.3% from 45 to 64, and 9.0% who were 65 years of age or older. The median age was 37 years. For every 100 females, there were 105.6 males. For every 100 females age 18 and over, there were 107.5 males.

The median income for a household in the township was $45,625, and the median income for a family was $50,625. Males had a median income of $31,250 versus $21,250 for females. The per capita income for the township was $16,329. There were no families and 1.7% of the population living below the poverty line, including no under eighteens and none of those over 64.

References

Townships in Wilkin County, Minnesota
Wahpeton micropolitan area
Townships in Minnesota